The Court of Honor is a 1948 Soviet drama film directed by Abram Room.

Plot 
Soviet scientists-biochemists Losev and Dobrotvorsky made a scientific discovery that allowed one to effectively fight against pain. They went on a scientific trip to the United States, where, they shared the results of their research with Americans who they thought were colleagues, but who actually were businessmen and spies. While still in the U.S., they also published an article about uncompleted work of their team. Upon their return to the Soviet Union, the scientists were criticized for their actions in the United States. They defended themselves, insisting that "science has no boundaries" and that knowledge should belong to all mankind. Dobrotvorsky was strongly condemned by his wife, who was outraged by his "ideological immaturity." As a result of their actions, the scientists were convicted of cosmopolitanism and punished by a court of honor. Dobrotvorsky repented of his act.

Starring 
 Boris Chirkov as Academician Andrey Vereysky
 Antonina Maksimova as Olga
 Evgeniy Samoylov as Nikolay
 Nikolai Annenkov as Prof. Aleksandr Dobrotvorsky
 Olga Zhizneva as Dr. Tatyana Dobrotvorskaya
 Nikolai Svobodin as Prof. Sergey Losev
 Lidiya Sukharevskaya as Nina Loseva
 Vasili Makarov as Kirillov
 Ivan Pereverzev as Ivan Petrenko

References

External links 
 

1948 films
1940s Russian-language films
Soviet drama films
1948 drama films
Soviet black-and-white films